Y Gwyliedydd (established by the Wesleyan Church in 1877) was a weekly Welsh language newspaper, distributed in districts of North and South Wales, and the main cities of England. It contained local and general news. 

Associated titles: Gwyliedydd Newydd (1910–1977).

References

Newspapers published in Wales
Newspapers established in 1877
1877 establishments in Wales